Erqi may refer to:

Erqi District, in Zhengzhou, Henan, China
Erqi Memorial Tower, in Zhengzhou, Henan, China